The 1938 United States Senate elections occurred in the middle of Franklin D. Roosevelt's second term. The 32 seats of Class 3 were contested in regular elections, and special elections were held to fill vacancies. The Republicans gained eight seats from the Democrats, though this occurred after multiple Democratic gains since the 1932 election, leading to the Democrats retaining a commanding lead over the Republicans with more than two-thirds of the legislative chamber.

A contemporary account cited a number of reasons for the losses suffered by the Democrats. The Recession of 1937 had continued into the first half of 1938, and had arguably weakened public confidence in the administration's New Deal economic policies, along with controversy over the Judicial Procedures Reform Bill of 1937 (Roosevelt's "court-packing" plan).

There were, in addition, strains between the more liberal New Deal supporters and the conservative wing of the Democratic party centered in the Southern states, which were exacerbated by an effort led by President Roosevelt to target certain conservative senators for defeat in Democratic primaries, including Walter George of Georgia, Millard Tydings of Maryland and Ellison Smith of South Carolina. While a number of New Deal supporters won primary elections, such as Alben Barkley in Kentucky, who defeated Happy Chandler, James P. Pope of Idaho, a prominent New Deal supporter, lost his bid for re-nomination, as did California's William McAdoo — though McAdoo's Democratic opponent, Sheridan Downey, had campaigned as a liberal New Dealer who would also do more to improve pension plans.

President Franklin D. Roosevelt had faced opposition from conservative Democrats and the Republicans in Congress since the beginning of his presidency. Josiah Bailey, Edward R. Burke, Harry F. Byrd, James F. Byrnes, Walter F. George, Peter G. Gerry, Carter Glass, Pat Harrison, Rush Holt Sr., and Ellison D. Smith were the conservative Democratic senators that opposed Roosevelt's policies although Harrison and Byrnes had initially supported the New Deal. Vice President John Nance Garner pushed for Roosevelt to support more conservative policies. The Republicans gained eight seats in the Senate while the Democrats maintained their majority. However, there were around twenty unreliable Democratic votes for Roosevelt which allowed conservatives to block his policies.

Gains, losses, and holds

Retirements
Three Democrats retired instead of seeking re-election.

Defeats
Ten Democrats sought re-election but lost in the primary or general election.

Death
One Democrat died on June 17th, 1938 and his seat remained vacant until the election.

Change in composition

Before the elections

Result of the elections

Race summaries

Special elections during the 75th Congress
In these special elections, the winner was seated during 1938 or before January 3, 1939; ordered by election date.

Races leading to the 76th Congress
In these general elections, the winners were elected for the term beginning January 3, 1939; ordered by state.

All of the elections involved the Class 3 seats.

Closest races 
Thirteen races had a margin of victory under 10%:

There is no tipping point state.

Alabama 

There were 2 elections due to the August 19, 1937 resignation of two-term Democrat Hugo Black.  Democrat Dixie Bibb Graves was appointed August 20, 1937 (by her husband, the governor) to finish Black's term.

Alabama (special) 

After congressman J. Lister Hill won the January 4, 1938 Democratic primary, Gibbs resigned and Hill was appointed to continue the term until the April 26, 1938 special election, which he won unopposed.

Hill was then easily re-elected in November to the next term.

Alabama (regular)

Arizona 

Incumbent Democrat Carl Hayden was re-elected to a third term, defeating Republican nominee Burt H. Clingan, chairman of the Arizona Industrial Commission, in the general election.

In contrast to previous elections, Hayden was easily reelected, receiving only token opposition from a relatively unknown Republican challenger.

Arkansas

California

Colorado

Connecticut

Florida

Georgia

Idaho

Illinois 

Incumbent Democrat William H. Dieterich retired, making this an open-seat.

Indiana

Iowa

Kansas

Kentucky

Louisiana

Maryland

Missouri

Nevada

New Hampshire

New Jersey (special)

New York 

There were 2 elections due to the June 17, 1938 death of three-term Democrat Royal S. Copeland.

New York (regular) 

New York Republicans nominated John Lord O'Brian for the U.S. Senate. Democrats re-nominated the incumbent Wagner. The American Labor party endorsed Wagner.

New York (special) 

New York Republicans nominated Edward Corsi for the short term to fill the vacancy caused by the death of Royal S. Copeland. Democrats nominated James M. Mead. The American Labor party endorsed Mead.

North Carolina

North Dakota

Ohio

Oklahoma

Oregon 

There were 2 elections for the same seat, due to the January 31, 1938 resignation of two-term Republican Frederick Steiwer.  Democratic businessman Alfred E. Reames was appointed February 11, 1938 to continue the term, pending a special election, but he did not run in either the special or the general elections.

Oregon (special) 

Republican Alexander G. Barry was elected to finish the term, but was not a candidate for the next term.

Oregon (regular)

Pennsylvania

South Carolina

South Dakota 

There were 2 elections for the same seat due to the December 20, 1936 death of three-term Republican Peter Norbeck.  Democrat Herbert Hitchcock was appointed December 29, 1936 to continue the term, pending a special election.

South Dakota (special)

South Dakota (regular) 

Hitchcock lost the Democratic May 3, 1938 primary for the next term to Governor of South Dakota Tom Berry.

Tennessee (special)

Utah

Vermont

Washington

Wisconsin

Further reading
 Dunn, Susan. Roosevelt's Purge: How FDR Fought to Change the Democratic Party (2010)  excerpt and text search
 Hixson, Walter L. "The 1938 Kentucky Senate Election: Alben W. Barkley, "Happy" Chandler, and The New Deal." Register of the Kentucky Historical Society (1982): 309-329. in JSTOR
 Plesur, Milton. "The Republican Congressional Comeback of 1938", Review of Politics Vol. 24, No. 4 (October 1962), pp. 525–562 in JSTOR
 Official New York result: LEHMAN PLURALITY OFFICIALLY 64,394; State Board Puts His Vote Finally at 2,391,286, With 2,326,892 for Dewey LABOR'S POLL AT 419,979 Blank, Void and Scattered Ballots Totaled 75,047; Poletti Won by 229,361 in NYT on December 8, 1938 (subscription required)

See also
 1938 United States elections
 1938 United States gubernatorial elections
1938 United States House of Representatives elections
 75th United States Congress
 76th United States Congress

Notes

References